The Bibliography of Benjamin Franklin is a comprehensive list of primary and secondary works by or about Benjamin Franklin, one of the principal Founding Fathers of the United States. Works about Franklin have been consistently published during and after Franklin's life, spanning four centuries, and continue to appear in present-day publications. Scholarly works that are not necessarily subject-specific to Franklin, yet cover his life and efforts in significant measure, may also be included here, while the numerous encyclopedia articles and short essays about Franklin are not included in this bibliography.

Biographical

18th century

19th century
 Franklin's letter writing covered well in this work

20th century
 
 
 
 
 
 
 
 
 
 
 
 Franklin one of the central figures in this work
 
 
 
 
  — A comprehensive index (1466 pages) with hundreds of references to letters to and from Franklin, mostly involving the Continental Congress
 
 
 
 

 
 

 
 
 
 
 
 
 
 
 
 

 
 Pictured on the cover, Franklin's diplomatic role is extensively covered in this work
 
 
  
 
 
 
 
 
 
 
 

  
 
 
 
 
 
 
 
 
 
 
 
 Covers Franklin's diplomatic role in France extensively
 
 (Covers Franklin's involvement with Priestly regarding electrical experiments and the English enlightenment)
 
 
 
 
 Franklin's diplomatic role is well covered in this work
 
 

 
 
 
 
 
 
 
 
 
 
 
   (Also published in 1948, 1966, 1987 and 1991)

21st century

 
 . 
 

 (Many references to Franklin throughout the work)
 
 
 
 
 
 
  — Numerous references to Franklin throughout the work, with much commentary on works like Poor Richard, etc.
 Covers Franklin's role among the Founding Fathers and the founding of the American nation
 
  — Numerous references to Franklin while in England throughout this work
 
 
 
 
 

 
 
 
 
 
 
 
 
 

 
 
 
 
 
 

 (Bancroft, a British spy in France, worked in close association with Franklin who is referred to extensively throughout this work)
 
 
 
 
 
 
 Franklin is the central figure throughout this work

Historical journals

20th-century
 
 
  — Covers the relationship between Franklin and Galloway extensively
  — Covers the relationship between Franklin and Galloway extensively

21st-century

Letters and writings

During Franklin's lifetime he corresponded with hundreds of people, especially during the revolutionary era. Historian Carl Becker says of Franklin that he "was acquainted personally or through correspondence with more men of eminence in letters, science and politics than any other man of his time". Historian John Bach McMaster, wrote at length about Franklin's letter writing, characterizing him as, "a man of letters".

Works about Franklin's papers
 
 
 
 

 (Not to be confused with the subject of this article: Covers Franklin's literary style, use of capitols, italics, contractions, etc.)
  Catalog contains letters and artificacts belonging or relating to Franklin
 
 
 
 
  — Twelve volumes with numerous examples of Franklin's correspondence to and from the founders

Publisher and printer

Most of Franklin's biographers cover his printing and publishing involvements in varying proportions, while other works focus on this idea entirely. Franklin's early and mid life was greatly involved in that effort, beginning as an apprentice in the Boston print shop of his brother, James Franklin.  He soon acquired and became the editor of The Pennsylvania Gazette and began publishing Poor Richard's Almanack. Franklin also brought innovations to the printing trade, helped to establish paper mills, and introduced new an improved printing type to colonial printers. During his career he took on various apprentices, and helped establish other upstart printers. Franklin's persistent efforts subsequently brought him favorable notoriety in printing and publishing circles, and a good measure of wealth by mid-life, inspiring him to write, The Way to Wealth in 1758.
 
 
   (David Hall was Franklin's newspaper and printing partner)
  — (Numerous references to Franklin and his newspaper involvements)
   (This work contains numerous references to Franklin as printer and publisher.)
  — Numerous references to Franklin and his brother James in the newspaper and printing business
 
 
 
 
 
 
 
 
 
 (Numerous references to Franklin as a printer and his involvement with other printers and publishers)
 (Numerous references to Franklin as a printer and his involvement with other printers and publishers)
  — Cover's Franklin's involvements in helping to improve paper-mills and the manufacture of paper.

Inventor, scientist
Franklin was widely considered by his contemporaries and others to be the best scientist in his time. He became curious about scientific phenomena as a youth, didn't pursue the field for pecuniary purposes, and rarely patented his inventions. Many of Franklin's scientific pursuits, mostly involving electricity, occurred while he was in England, where was made a member of the Royal Society and worked with scientists like John Canton, Peter Collinson, Johann Friedrich, John Hadley, Georg Wilhelm Richmann and Joseph Priestley, a well-known scientist in his own right who worked closely with Franklin, and did much to spread his fame.

 

 
 
 
 
 
 
 
 
 
  — Fellow scientist and colleague of Franklin; Priestley's work makes numerous references to Franklin throughout volumes one and two.

Primary sources
 
  - A selection of letters from The Papers of Benjamin Franklin, published in commemoration of the 250th anniversary of Franklin's birth
 
 
 
 
 
 
 
 
 
 
  — This work has been published by numerous publishers over the years.
 
 
 
 
 
 
 
  — See also: Wikipedia: The Morals of Chess
 
 
 —— (1725). A Dissertation on Liberty and Necessity, Pleasure and Pain

Autobiography

Many editions of Franklin's autobiography have been published over the years, some with letters, writings and other related material authored by Franklin. Franklin's original manuscript of his autobiography, written in French, was not published while Franklin was alive and had disappeared sometime after his death. It was later discovered by Edouard Laboulaye and purchased by John Bigelow for 25,000 franks, who published it in 1868.
 
 
 Spofford Includes a twenty-one page introduction about Franklin.
 
 
 
 
 
 
 Contains an appendix which includes a seven-page Afterword, Franklin's last will and testament, and a list of sources

The Papers of Benjamin Franklin

This collection of Franklin's letters and other works is a collaborative effort by a team of scholars and editors at Yale University and American Philosophical Society and is an ongoing effort which began in 1959, with more than forty volumes published, and is expected to reach upwards near fifty volumes upon completion. Those that are available for viewing are listed below.

The Writings of Benjamin Franklin
The Writings of Benjamin Franklin is a collection of works, edited by Professor Albert Henry Smyth, a past member of the American Historical Society, and published in ten volumes between 1905 and 1907

Further information
Many of the papers of individuals closely associated with Franklin often offer much information about Franklin.

See also

 Bibliography of early American publishers and printers
 Bibliography of George Washington
 Bibliography of Thomas Jefferson
 Bibliography of the American Revolution
 Bibliography of the War of 1812

Citations

Sources

External links
 National Archives search: Correspondence and Other Writings of Seven Major Shapers of the United States
 Introduction to the Papers of Benjamin Franklin, Professor Edmund S. Morgan

Benjamin Franklin
American history books
Colonial American printers
History of the United States journals
Manuscripts by collection